The Mutual Assistance Cabinet was the Indonesian Cabinet which served under President Megawati Sukarnoputri and Vice President Hamzah Haz from 10 August 2001 until 20 October 2004. The Cabinet was formed after Megawati and Hamzah were elected President and Vice President at the Special Session of the People's Consultative Assembly in July 2001.

Cabinet Lineup 
{| class="wikitable" border="1"
|- bgcolor=LightGrey
!  rowspan=2 | Position || colspan=3 | Effective
|- bgcolor=LightGrey
! 10 August 2001 ||Changes I - 11 March 2004|| Changes II -  22 April 2004
|- bgcolor=MintCream 
| colspan=4 |

Coordinating ministers 
|-
| Coordinating Minister of Politics and Security
| Susilo Bambang Yudhoyono
| colspan=2|Hari Sabarno
|-
| Coordinating Minister for the Economy
| colspan=3|Dorodjatun Kuntjoro-Jakti
|-
| Coordinating Minister for People's Welfare
| colspan=2|Jusuf Kalla
| Malik Fadjar
|- bgcolor=MintCream 
| colspan=4 |

Departmental ministers 
|-
| Minister of Foreign Affairs
| colspan=3|Hassan Wirajuda
|-
| Minister of Home Affairs
| colspan=3|Hari Sabarno
|-
| Minister of Justice and Human Rights
| colspan=3|Yusril Ihza Mahendra
|-
| Minister of Industry and Trade
|colspan=3|Rini Soewandi
|-
| Minister of Energy and Mineral Resources
| colspan=3|Purnomo Yusgiantoro
|-
| Minister of Finance 
| colspan=3|Boediono
|- 
| Minister of Forestry 
| colspan=3|M. Prakosa
|-  
| Minister of Agriculture
| colspan=3|Bungaran Saragih
|-  
| Minister of Health
| colspan=3|Achmad Sujudi
|-  
| Minister of Social Affairs
| colspan=3|Bachtiar Chamsyah
|- 
| Minister of Education
| colspan=3|Malik Fadjar
|-  
| Minister of Religious Affairs 
| colspan=3|Said Agil Al Munawwar
|-  
| Minister of Maritime Affairs and Fisheries 
| colspan=3|Rokhmin Dahuri
|- 
| Minister of Transportation
| colspan=2|Agum Gumelar
| Sunarno
|-  
| Minister of Manpower and Transmigration
| colspan=3|Jacob Nuwawea
|-
| Minister of Culture and Tourism
|colspan=3| I Gede Ardika
|- 
| Minister of Defense
|colspan=3| Matori Abdul Djalil
|-
| colspan=4 |

State ministers 
|- 
| State Minister of Cooperatives and Small and Medium Businesses
|colspan=3 |Ali Marwan Hanan
|-  
| State Minister of Environment (Indonesia)|State Minister of Environment
|colspan=3 |Nabiel Makarim
|- 
| State Minister of Research and Technology
|colspan=3 |Hatta Rajasa
|-  
| State Minister of Administrative Reforms
|colspan=3 |Faisal Tamin
|-  
| State Minister of Female Empowerment
|colspan=3| Sri Redjeki Sumarj
|-  
| State Minister of Eastern Indonesia Regional Development Acceleration
|colspan=3 |Manuel Kaisiepo
|-  
| State Minister of State Owned Enterprises (BUMN)
|colspan=3|Laksamana Sukardi
|- 
| State Minister of National Development Planning and Chairperson of the National Development Planning Agency (Bappenas) 
|colspan=3| Kwik Kian Gie
|- 
| State Minister of Communication and Information
|colspan=3 |Syamsul Muarif
|- 
| State Minister of Settlement and Regional Infrastructure
|colspan=3 |Sunarno
|- bgcolor=MintCream 
| colspan=4 |

Officials With Ministerial Rank 
|- 
| Attorney General
| colspan=3|M. A. Rachman
|-
| State Secretary
| colspan=3|Bambang Kesowo
|-
| Chief of the National Intelligence Body (BIN)
| colspan=3|A. M. Hendropriyono
|-
|}

Changes
11 March 2004: Susilo Bambang Yudhoyono resigned from the Cabinet. Hari Sabarno took over the Coordinating Ministry of Politics and Security whilst continuing as Minister of Home Affairs.
22 April 2004: Jusuf Kalla resigned from the Cabinet. Malik Fadjar took over the Coordinating Ministry of People's Welfare whilst continuing as Minister of Education.

References

Notes

External links
 List of Cabinet members

Post-Suharto era
Cabinets of Indonesia
2001 establishments in Indonesia
2004 disestablishments in Indonesia
Cabinets established in 2001
Cabinets disestablished in 2004